Akl Awit (Arabic: عقل العويط born 1952, Bziza) is a Lebanese poet, critic, literary journalist and academic professor holding a Ph.D degree in modern Arabic literature. All his life, Awit has been passionate about poetry, for it has been the mean for him to express his feelings. His writings have been known to be bold and “daring”. Awit’s work, including individual poetry books and anthologies, has been published not only locally, but also translated and distributed internationally.

Biography

Early life 
Akl Awit grew up in Bziza, a village in the North of Lebanon. Awit’s love for literature was innate and grew even more because of the environment he lived in; a family that lives in a house surrounded by books and a grandfather who himself was an orator. They would go from their house in the mountains to a village in the coast named chekka for the main purpose of studying and reading. His family rented books from a shop called “Abou Georges” and all 

including his siblings, took turns in reading them. Awit started writing short poems about his dreams and frustrations ever since he was in high school, but were all drafts. He aspired to become better than the best and looked up to many poets including Fouad Sleiman, Gebran Khalil Gebran and Ounsi el-hajj. His passion for writing grew more and more. He was also inspired by french poems and french culture which helped him translate his ideas and write down his works.

Personal life 
Akl never followed nor tended to a specific political party, on the contrary, he was part of a group called “Awareness” (in Arabic “ الوعي”) back in university that opposed all existing parties at the time. In a sense, he believed in being free.  To this day, Akl Awit is still against all political parties and believes that they are the reason why Lebanon is getting destroyed, he even showcased his anger about this topic throughout his articles in "Jaridat Al Nahar".

At some point in his life, Akl fell in love with, also poet and writer, Joumana Haddad. They got married and had a son “Ounsi” named after the Lebanese poet  Ounsi el-hajj, however, later on went their separate ways.

At the present time, Akl looks back to marriage and regards it as “useless”.  

Other than writing, Awit enjoys listening to music with a particular love for jazz and classical music. His favorite artists include Beethoven and Feyrouz. Moreover, Awit loves drawing and sculpting. He enjoys any activity that requires his artistic assistance. Akl Awit’s house is made up of at least one hundred distinct paintings, and he views it as his own museum. Also, Awit loves spending time in his garden when he’s at his mountain house during the weekends with his dog Cooper.

Career 
Akl Awit later on found himself sharing one of his writings for the first time in a poetry competition at university. It was then that he acknowledged his great love for the Arabic Language and his character began to stand out.

His first five published books were all handwritten initially, however, around 1987, Akl eventually had to shift to typing his writings onto a computer; especially since he was working as a journalist in France. Nevertheless, the process of composing his poems, he explains (A. Awit, personal communication, November 7, 2020), is a lengthy one. His first writing is never his last writing. When a sudden event occurs, Awit does not rest until he finishes his writing of it. Sometimes, this process takes days he explains, but he tries to finish the work with no interrupted thoughts.

As his career flourished, Akl continued writing and publishing various poems as well as taking part in different discussions tackling his specialization and sometimes even giving lectures. “MULHAK”- a cultural supplement for one of Lebanon’s most common newspapers An-Nahar-  is currently still under his editorial director influence. Also, he teaches modern poetry and journalism at the Saint Joseph University in Beirut.

In 2003, Akl published an article in An-Nahar- titled “Letter to God” (in Arabic: رسالة إلى الله) which received a “harsh” response from the people, mainly because it was very daring and unprecedented. The newspaper published the article on the front page of the paper. Because its content offended some, it resulted in several filed lawsuits against him and even an act of setting the newspaper on fire in one of the villages in the North of Lebanon.

Also in 2016, Akl Awit won the Nikos Gatsos prize for his work "L'Échapée (The Orient of books)" that year.

Bibliography in Arabic
 Erasing the exile of water - ماحياً غربة الماء - Beirut 1981
 Leaning on the flower of the body - المتكئة على زهرة الجسد - Beirut 1985
 Reading the obscurity - قراءة الظلام - Beirut 1986
 Under the sun of the inner body - تحت شمس الجسد الباطن - Beirut 1991
 I invited no one - لم أدعُ احداً - Beirut 1994
 Domain of the cypress - مقام السروة - Beirut 1996
 Open the days so that I disappear behind them - افتحي الأيام لأختفي وراءها - Beirut 1998
 Setting the dead free - سراح القتيل - Beirut 2001
 Another sky (anthology) - سماء أخرى - Cairo 2002
Personal Bible - إنجيل شخصي - Beirut 2009
Birth certificate - وثيقة ولادة - Beirut 2011
Skyping - سكايبينغ - Beirut 2013
The escape - L'Échapée - Beirut 2016

Current work 
Akl Awit has three unpublished books and still writes frequently. After the August 4 explosion in Beirut, Awit got inspired to write about this incident to describe the “hell” Beirut is going through. He believes Beirut to be the heart and home of poetry but after all it has gone through, it is now destroyed. Because of his frustration, Akl Awit decided to end his publishing strike and will soon publish his article about the explosion and is working on translating it in both English and French. He wants the world to know the reality Lebanon is going through.(A. Awit, personal communication, November 7, 2020)

References

External links

 http://www.aklawit.com

20th-century Lebanese poets
Living people
1952 births
Writers from Beirut
Academic staff of Saint Joseph University
Lebanese journalists
Lebanese male poets
20th-century male writers